The Croydon Canal ran  from Croydon, via Forest Hill, to the Grand Surrey Canal at New Cross in south London, England. It opened in 1809 and closed in 1836, the first canal to be abandoned by an Act of Parliament.

History
Authorised by an Act of Parliament in 1801, the canal was originally intended to extend northwards to Rotherhithe, but the simultaneous construction of the Grand Surrey Canal provided a convenient access route.

The Croydon Canal linked to the Croydon, Merstham and Godstone Railway (itself connected to the Surrey Iron Railway), enabling the canal to be used to transport stone and lime from workings at Merstham. The canal was never extended further south-west, as was initially intended, to reach Epsom.

The canal was originally planned with two inclined planes but 28 locks, arranged in two flights, were used instead. To keep the canal supplied with water, reservoirs were constructed at Sydenham and South Norwood; the latter still exists as South Norwood Lake in a public park.

By 1811, 22 barges plied the canal. The main cargo was timber.

After the initial flights of locks, most of the canal followed the  contour.

The final two locks at Croydon Common raised the canal to the  contour, and because there was no natural source of water a steam pumping station was built at the foot of the locks to pump water up to the summit pound. In June 1830 a new pumping engine was installed on Croydon Common which was the first commercial installation of Samuel Brown's gas vacuum engine, and quite probably the first commercial internal combustion engine in the world. The economics of the gas engine were interesting as the gas it consumed was made by turning coal into coke. The value of the resulting coke and coal tar by-products of making the gas substantially exceeded the cost of the coal, ground rent, repairs etc., so the gas vacuum engine made a profit of over £100 a year before considering the useful work it was doing.

The canal was never a success and closed in 1836, the first canal to be abandoned by an Act of Parliament. Much of the alignment was used by the London & Croydon Railway Company, which had bought the canal for £40,250, for part of the railway between London Bridge and West Croydon station, which is on the site of the canal basin. The gas vacuum engine appears to have been in full working order when offered for sale in 1837. Tenders for its purchase (including the  diameter gasometer) were to be sent to the offices of the Croydon Railway Company, which shared the same address as the London and Croydon Railway Company and dealt with the acquisition of the canal and disposal of any unwanted assets.

Today
After the canal closed, sections were retained for leisure use, and some remained in water for a considerable time. The section at the Anerley Arms, Ridsdale Road in Anerley was used as a boating lake, and the area was called Anerley Tea Rooms. The canal in Betts Park was turned into a concrete trough in 1934, approximately 170m can still be seen at the northern corner of Betts Park. Another section exists as a long curved pond in the Dacres Wood Nature Reserve in Dacres Road, Forest Hill. This was considered for redevelopment in 1989, but research by Lewisham Council resulted in its identity being confirmed and it now forms an attractive wetland, having been returned to its former width. There is a high pavement in David's Road, Forest Hill, which is thought to be part of the towpath. Part of the wall below the path has been rebuilt with murals depicting transport in Forest Hill.
The Norwood reservoir is now preserved as South Norwood Lake.

Points of interest

Gallery

See also

Canals of the United Kingdom
History of the British canal system

Bibliography

References

Canals in London
Transport in the London Borough of Croydon
History of the London Borough of Croydon
History of transport in London
Canals opened in 1809